The Olympia Brewing Company was a brewery in the northwest United States, located in Tumwater, Washington, near Olympia.  Founded in 1896 by Leopold Friederich Schmidt, it was bought by G. Heileman Brewing Company in 1983. Through a series of consolidations, it was acquired by Pabst Brewing Company in 1999; the Tumwater brewery was closed in 2003.

History
Leopold Schmidt, a German immigrant from Montana founded The Capital Brewing Company at Tumwater Falls on the Deschutes River in the town of Tumwater, near the south end of Puget Sound. He built a four-story wooden brewhouse, a five-story cellar building, a one-story ice factory powered by the lower falls, and a bottling and keg plant and in 1896, began brewing and selling Olympia Beer. In 1902, the firm became Olympia Brewing Company, with Frank Kenney as the Company Secretary. It was Frank Kenney who proposed the slogan "It's the Water" to promote the brewery's flagship product. Statewide Prohibition, which began in January 1916, four years before National Prohibition, ended beer making operations. After Prohibition ended, a new Olympia Brewery  was erected just upstream from the original, and Olympia beer went back on sale in 1934.

Olympia was a very popular regional brand in the Pacific Northwest for half of a century. It eventually expanded nationwide, repositioned as a low-price lager. During the 1970s, Olympia acquired Hamm's and Lone Star, and also produced Buckhorn Beer, which had previously been a product of the Lone Star Brewing Company. Until the mid-1970s, competitor Coors of Colorado had a limited 11-state distribution area; Washington and Montana were not added until 1976, and Oregon did not approve sales of Coors in grocery stores until 1985.

Between 1970 and 1980 Olympia faced flat revenues among consolidating nationwide breweries and, in 1982, the Schmidt family, which owned and operated the brewery and company, elected to sell the company. Olympia was subsequently purchased by G. Heileman Brewing Company in 1983, which was purchased by Stroh Brewery Company in 1996. In 1999, Pabst bought most of the Stroh brands, including Olympia.

The brewery was eventually purchased by Miller Brewing Company. For a time, the Olympia brewery took over the brewing of other Pacific Northwest brands as their original breweries were closed one by one, including the Lucky Lager brewery in Vancouver, Washington, the Henry Weinhard's brewery in Portland, and even the brewery of its arch-rival, Rainier Beer, in Seattle. In 2002, SAB bought out Miller Brewing Co. SABMiller closed the Tumwater facility in mid-2003, citing the unprofitability of such a small brewery.

Pabst was purchased, along with the Olympia label, by beer industry veteran Eugene Kashper with backing from TSG Consumer Partners in 2014, and Olympia Beer was brewed under contract by MillerCoors at their brewery in Irwindale, California.

Ag Energy Resources of Benton, Illinois purchased the machinery from Olympia Brewing to make ethanol for motor fuel use.

Part of the brewery complex was heavily damaged in a fire on October 7, 2018. The administration building's south side partially collapsed, and a 3-alarm fire call caused fire units to respond from many neighboring departments.

On January 25, 2021 Pabst Brewing Company announced on Twitter that it was "temporarily pausing production" of Olympia Beer because of a lack of demand and to focus attention on its distilled spirit line under the Olympia Distilling Company brand.

Use of artesian water
For many years, Olympia Beer was brewed with water obtained from artesian wells.  The company's promotions made much of the use of artesian water in the brewing process. One later advertising campaign, rather than explaining what artesian water was, claimed the water was controlled by a mythical population of "artesians". Once the brewery was taken over by a larger company, the use of artesian water was discontinued, and so was that advertising campaign.

In downtown Olympia, current efforts to preserve the use of artesian water at one of the remaining public wells has been the mission of H2Olympia: Artesian Well Advocates.

In popular culture

Daredevil Evel Knievel was sponsored by Olympia Beer.  Olympia paid a hefty price tag to have Evel sew patches onto his jackets, signs on his vehicles, even stitching "Olympia Beer" onto parachutes attached to his dragster.  This was an attempt to take Olympia nationwide.

Dustin Hoffman's Benjamin Braddock drinks an Olympia beer in The Graduate (1967). Paul Newman drinks Olympia in the movie, Sometimes a Great Notion (1970). Nearly the entire cast, including Marvin Gaye drinks Olympia bottles, stubbies, cans and tall boys, in Chrome and Hot Leather (1971). A neon sign advertising Olympia beer can be seen in the window of the liquor store in American Graffiti (1973). Clint Eastwood promoted the brand in several popular films, including Magnum Force (1973), Thunderbolt and Lightfoot (1974), The Eiger Sanction (1975), Every Which Way but Loose (1978) (in which his orangutan Clyde also indulges), and Oly is seen in Any Which Way You Can (1980). The werewolves of "The Colony" in 1980's The Howling drink Oly, as do Farmer Vincent and his family in Motel Hell, and Rebecca Balding is seen drinking Olympia in bed in Silent Scream, also from that year. The Blues Brothers Band drinks $300 worth of Olympia in 'Bob's Country Bunker' tavern in The Blues Brothers (1980) John Denver drinks an Olympia in "Oh, God!" (1977). Signage and cans being consumed are also easily visible in The China Syndrome (1979). The brand was also featured in the movie Friday the 13th Part III (1982) and Airport 1975 (1974). A neon light Olympia Beer sign can be seen in the roadhouse bar in the vampire cult-classic Near Dark (1987) and in the Matt Damon film Promised Land (2012). In the independent B-movie Clawed: The Legend of Sasquatch (2005), the teen-age campers and the adult hunters were drinking the brand. Josh Brolin's George W. Bush drinks a barely recognizable bottle of Olympia beer in W. (2008). Bill Hader's character drinks several cans of Olympia Beer in The To Do List (2013). Many of the characters in The Hollywood Knights drink Olympia beer in stubby bottles. It can also be seen in the 1983 American horror/thriller film Cujo.  Olympia Beer is also being drank by Tommy Lee Jones in A Coal Miners Daughter.

The second word in American rock band Creedence Clearwater Revival's name is derived from an Olympia advertising campaign.

The movie House of Games includes a set with cases of Olympia Beer stacked toward the back of the room.

In a Mickey Rooney movie from the Andy Hardy series, the title character has to change a tire on his dad's car. On the street in front of their house, Mickey and his dad remove a case of Olympia Beer from the trunk to get at the spare tire jack.

Olympia Beer was praised as one of the top 25 beers in the world in a 2012 MensJournal.com review article.

See also
History of Olympia, Washington
 List of defunct breweries in the United States

References

External links
Olympia Beer Official Web site

Food and drink companies established in 1896
Defunct companies based in Olympia, Washington
History of Olympia, Washington
Defunct brewery companies of the United States
Food and drink companies disestablished in 2003
1896 establishments in Washington (state)
2003 disestablishments in Washington (state)
Tumwater, Washington